The United States men's national ice hockey team is based in Colorado Springs, Colorado, with its U18 and U17 development program in Plymouth, Michigan. The team is controlled by USA Hockey, the governing body for organized ice hockey in the United States. The U.S. team is currently ranked 4th in the IIHF World Rankings.

The U.S. won gold medals at the 1960 and the 1980 Olympics and more recently, silver medals at the 2002 and 2010 Olympics. The U.S. also won the 1996 World Cup of Hockey, defeating Canada in the finals. The team's most recent medal at the World Championships came with a bronze in 2021. They won the tournament in 1933 and 1960. Unlike other nations, the U.S. doesn't typically use its best NHL players in the World Championships. Instead, it provides the younger players with an opportunity to gain international experience. Overall, the team has collected eleven Olympic medals (two of them gold), nineteen World Championship medals (two of them gold), and it reached the semi-final round of the Canada Cup/World Cup five times, twice advancing to the finals and winning gold once. The U.S. has never reached a World Championship gold medal game, having lost in the semi-final round eleven times since the IIHF introduced a playoff system in 1992.

The U.S. is one of the most successful national ice hockey teams in the world and a member of the so-called "Big Six", the unofficial group of the six strongest men's ice hockey nations, along with Canada, the Czech Republic, Finland, Russia, and Sweden.

History
The American ice hockey team's greatest success was the "Miracle on Ice" at the 1980 Winter Olympics in Lake Placid, New York, when American college players defeated the heavily favored seasoned professionals from the Soviet Union on the way to a gold medal. Though ice hockey is not a major sport in most areas of the United States, the "Miracle" is often listed as one of the all-time greatest American sporting achievements. The U.S. also won the gold medal in the 1960 Games at Squaw Valley, California, defeating the Soviet Union, Canada, Czechoslovakia, and Sweden along the way. However, since this victory is not as well known as the 1980 win, it has come to be known as the "Forgotten Miracle".

The United States hockey experienced a spike in talent in the 1980s and 1990s, with future NHL stars including Tony Amonte, Chris Chelios, Derian Hatcher, Brett Hull, Pat LaFontaine, John LeClair, Brian Leetch, Mike Modano, Mike Richter, Jeremy Roenick, Kevin Stevens, Keith Tkachuk, and Doug Weight. Although the U.S. finished no higher than fourth in any World or Olympic event from 1981 through 1994 (unlike other teams that used professionals, the U.S. team was limited to amateurs at these tournaments), the Americans reached the finals of the 1991 Canada Cup and won the 1996 World Cup. Six years later, after the International Olympic Committee and NHL arranged to accommodate an Olympic break in the NHL schedule, the U.S. earned a silver medal at the 2002 Winter Olympics with a roster that included NHL stars Adam Deadmarsh, Chris Drury, Brian Rafalski, and Brian Rolston. However, by 2006, many of these NHL players had retired or had declined with age. Though the 2006 Olympic team finished a disappointing 8th, it was more of a transitional team, featuring young NHL players like Rick DiPietro, John-Michael Liles, and Jordan Leopold.

The 2010 U.S. Olympic team was composed of much younger and faster players than teams of previous years, including David Backes, Dustin Brown, Jack Johnson, Patrick Kane, Phil Kessel, Zach Parise, Joe Pavelski, Bobby Ryan, Paul Stastny, and Ryan Suter. The team also had a solid group of veterans that included such stars as goalie Ryan Miller, defenseman Brian Rafalski, and team captain Jamie Langenbrunner. The U.S. team upset team Canada 5–3 in the round-robin phase of the tournament and went into the single elimination phase of the tournament as the number-one seeded team. After beating Finland 6–1, the U.S. advanced to the gold medal game, where they lost in overtime 3–2 to Canada to claim the silver medal. The gold medal game between Canada and the U.S. was watched by an estimated 27.6 million U.S. households. This was the most watched hockey game in America since the 1980 "Miracle on Ice" game, including any Stanley Cup final or NHL Winter Classic broadcast.

The NHL pulled out of the Olympics for the 2018 competition in a dispute over insurance and the IOC's ambush marketing restrictions, prohibiting the national teams from inviting any player it held under contract. The American team was put at a particular disadvantage, as more than 31% of NHL players are Americans (in comparison, only 4.1% are Russians). As a result, the U.S. had to enter the tournament with a hastily assembled team of free agents, players from European leagues, AHLers on one-way contracts, and college players. The team proved unsuccessful, losing to Slovenia and the Olympic Athletes from Russia in the preliminary round, and being eliminated by the Czechs in the quarterfinals. The OAR team benefited most from NHL's absence and ultimately won the tournament with a team that was composed primarily of SKA Saint Petersburg and HC CSKA Moscow players from the Russia-based KHL and featured ex-NHL all-stars Pavel Datsyuk, Ilya Kovalchuk and Vyacheslav Voynov (all SKA).

On March 31, 2021, Stan Bowman was appointed the general manager of the U.S. Olympic men's hockey team for the 2022 Beijing Games. On October 26, 2021, Bowman resigned in response to the results of an independent investigation into allegations of sexual assault committed by a member of the Blackhawks' video coaching staff. The lead investigator stated that Bowman's failure to report the alleged assault had eventually led to the perpetrator committing further acts of sexual abuse.

Competitive record

Olympic Games

Results by "Big Six" opponent

World Championships

Note: Between 1920 and 1968, the Olympic ice hockey tournament was also considered the World Championship for that year.
Note: World War II forced cancellation of all tournaments from 1940 to 1946.
Note: In 1972, a separate tournament was held both for the World Championships and the Winter Olympics for the first time.
Note: No World Championships were held during the Olympic years 1980, 1984, and 1988.
Note: the 2020 tournament was cancelled due to the COVID-19 pandemic.

1920 – 
1924 – 
1928 – did not participate
1930 – did not participate
1931 – 
1932 – 
1933 – 
1934 – 
1935 – did not participate
1936 – 
1937 – did not participate
1938 – 7th place
1939 – 
1947 – 5th place
1948 – 4th place
1949 – 
1950 – 
1951 – 6th place
1952 – 
1953 – did not participate
1954 – did not participate
1955 – 4th place
1956 – 
1957 – did not participate
1958 – 5th place
1959 – 4th place
1960 – 
1961 – 6th place
1962 – 
1963 – 8th place
1964 – 5th place
1965 – 6th place
1966 – 6th place
1967 – 5th place
1968 – 6th place
1969 – 6th place (relegated to Group B)
1970 – 7th place (1st in Group B, promoted to Group A)
1971 – 6th place (relegated to Group B)
1972 – 8th place (2nd in Group B)
1973 – 8th place (2nd in Group B)
1974 – 7th place (1st in Group B, promoted to Group A)
1975 – 6th place
1976 – 4th place
1977 – 6th place
1978 – 6th place
1979 – 7th place
1981 – 5th place
1982 – 8th place (relegated to Group B)
1983 – 9th place (1st in Group B, promoted to Group A)
1985 – 4th place
1986 – 6th place
1987 – 7th place
1989 – 6th place
1990 – 5th place
1991 – 4th place
1992 – 7th place
1993 – 6th place
1994 – 4th place
1995 – 6th place
1996 – 
1997 – 6th place
1998 – 12th place
1999 – 6th place
2000 – 5th place
2001 – 4th place
2002 – 7th place
2003 – 13th place
2004 – 
2005 – 6th place
2006 – 7th place
2007 – 5th place
2008 – 6th place
2009 – 4th place
2010 – 13th place
2011 – 8th place
2012 – 7th place
2013 – 
2014 – 6th place
2015 – 
2016 – 4th place
2017 – 5th place
2018 – 
2019 – 7th place
2021 – 
2022 – 4th place

Canada Cup / World Cup of Hockey

Results by "Big Six" opponent

Team

Current roster
Roster for the 2022 IIHF World Championship.

Head coach: David Quinn

IIHF World Championship directorate awards

The IIHF has given awards for each year's championship tournament to the top goalie, defenseman, and forward (all since 1954), and most valuable player (since 2004). The following American team members have won awards.
1955 – Don Rigazio (goalie)
1956 – Willard Ikola (goalie)
1959 – Bill Cleary (forward)
1960 – Jack McCartan (goalie)
1962 – John Mayasich (defenseman)
1967 – Carl Wetzel (goalie)
2004 – Ty Conklin (goalie)
2014 – Seth Jones (defenseman)
2018 – Patrick Kane (MVP)
2021 – Cal Petersen (goalie)

Uniform evolution

See also
List of United States national ice hockey team rosters

References

External links

IIHF profile
National Teams of Ice Hockey

Senior
National ice hockey teams in the Americas